Sportsmen Acres Community is an unincorporated community and former census-designated place (CDP) in Mayes County, Oklahoma, United States.  The population was 0 on the 2000 census; its population was not recorded for the 2010 census.

Geography 
According to the United States Census Bureau, the CDP has a total area of 1.8 square miles (4.5 km), of which 1.7 square miles (4.5 km) is land and 0.04 square mile (0.1 km) is water. The total area is 1.71% water. The CDP is located at 36.24573 N, 95.25118 W.

Demographics 
As of the 2000 Census, there were 0 people living in the CDP.

References

Unincorporated communities in Mayes County, Oklahoma
Former census-designated places in Oklahoma
Unincorporated communities in Oklahoma